Edward Bernard Foley (born 16 October 1948) is a member of the Capuchin Franciscan Order of the Province of St. Joseph, a Roman Catholic priest, educator, preacher, theologian and author. He is the Duns Scotus Professor Emeritus of Spirituality and Professor of Liturgy and Music at Catholic Theological Union, where he was the founding director of the Ecumenical Doctor of Ministry Program.

Early life and education 
Foley was born on 16 October 1948 in Gary, Indiana. He attended high school at St. Lawrence Seminary in Mt. Calvary, Wisconsin. Joining the Capuchins in 1966, he completed undergraduate studies in Music Education and Philosophy at St. Joseph’s College in Rensselaer, Indiana and the Capuchin Seminary of St. Mary in Crown Point, Indiana (1971). He completed an M.Div. at St. Francis School of Pastoral Ministry in Milwaukee (1975), and an M.Mus. in choral conducting at the University of Wisconsin Milwaukee (1975), while an organ student of Theophane Hytrek FAGO. He completed an M.A. in liturgical research (1980), an M.A. in course (1983) and the Ph.D. in Theology at the University of Notre Dame (1987).

Career  
Foley was Campus Minister at the College of St. Catherine in St. Paul, Minnesota (1975-1980), then on the faculty of Catholic Theological Union in Chicago (1984-2020). Adjunct appointments include Seattle University, University of St. Thomas (St. Paul, MN), St. Paul School of Theology (Brisbane), Notre Dame University and the University of Chicago.  Music critic for The National Catholic Reporter (1978-83), he was external examiner at the University of Limerick (2005-11, 2015). President of the North American Academy of Liturgy, a founding director of the Catholic Academy of Liturgy, he was on the executive committee of the International Academy of Practical Theology. In 2022 he was the Marten fellow in preaching at the University of Notre Dame.  Foley is a regular preacher at Old St. Patrick's Church in Chicago (2008- ). He is the vice-postulator for the canonization cause of Blessed Solanus Casey.

Books 
 Adoration after Vatican II.  Collegeville: The Liturgical Press.  .
 Preaching as Paying Attention: Theological Reflection in the Pulpit.  Chicago: Liturgy Training Publications, 2021.  .  
 Music: Its Theologies and Spiritualities - a global perspective.  Basel: MDPI, 2020.  .
 Defragmenting Franciscanism: Collaboration in a post Ite Vos era. Chicago: Catholic Theological Union, 2019. .
 Catholic Marriage: A Pastoral-Liturgical Handbook. Chicago: Liturgy Training Publications. 2019. .
 Practicing Ubuntu: Practical Theological Perspectives on Injustice, Personhood and human dignity. With Jaco Dreyer, Malan Nel and Yolanda Dreyer. Berlin: LIT Verlag, 2017. .
 Integrating Work in Theological Education. With Kathleen Cahalan and Gordon Mikoski. Eugene OR: Wipf and Stock, 2017. .
 A Handbook for Catholic Preaching. Collegeville: Liturgical Press, 2016. .
 Music and Spirituality. Basel, Switzerland: MDPI AG, 2015. .
 Theological Reflection Across Faith Traditions: The Turn to Reflective Believing. Rowman & Littlefield, 2015. .
 A Commentary on the Order of Mass of The Roman Missal: A new English Translation.  General Editor. Collegeville: The Liturgical Press, 2011. .
 Religion, Diversity and Conflict. General Editor. International Practical Theology, Vol. 8. Berlin: LIT Verlag, 2011. .
 A Lyrical Vision: US Bishops' Documents on Music. Collegeville: The Liturgical Press, 2009. .
 From Age to Age. Revised and enlarged. Collegeville: The Liturgical Press, 2008. .
 예배와 목회상담 힘 있는 이야기, 위험한 의례. Seoul: Christian Literature Center, 2017. .
 Hagan esto en Conmemoración Mía. Mexico City: Obra Nacional de la Buena Prensa, A.C., 2010. .
 Commentary on the General Instruction of the Roman Missal. General Editor. Collegeville: Liturgical Press, 2007. .
 Journey to Holiness: A Pilgrimage through the Solanus Casey Center. Detroit: MarkWest, 2007. .
 The Wisdom of Creation. with Robert Schreiter. Collegeville: The Liturgical Press 2004. .
 Mutuality Matters: Family, Faith and Justice. With Herbert Anderson, Bonnie Miller McLemore and Robert Schreiter. Lanham MD: Rowman & Littlefield, 2003. .
 Worship Music: A Concise Dictionary. General Editor. Collegeville: The Liturgical Press, 2000. .
 Preaching Basics. Chicago: Liturgy Training Publications, 1998. .
 Mighty Stories, Dangerous Rituals: The Intersection of Worship and Pastoral Care. With Herbert Anderson. Minneapolis: Fortress Press, 2019. .
 예배와 목회상담 힘 있는 이야기, 위험한 의례. Seoul: Hakjisa Publisher, 2012. .
 Ritual Music: Essays in Liturgical Musicology. Washington DC: The Pastoral Press, 1995. .
 Así Es: Stories of Hispanic Spirituality. With Arturo Perez and Consuelo Covarrubias. Collegeville: The Liturgical Press, 1994. .
 Así es Historias de Espiritualidad Hispana. With Arturo Perez and Consuelo Covarrubias. Collegeville: The Liturgical Press, 1994. . 
 Developmental Disabilities and Sacramental Access: New Paradigms for Sacramental Encounters. Collegeville: The Liturgical Press, 1994. .
 Foundations of Christian Music: The Music of Pre-Constantinian Christianity. GROW/Alcuin Publications. Nottingham, England, 1992. ; Revised edition. Collegeville: The Liturgical Press, 1996. .
 The Milwaukee Symposia for Church Composers: A Ten-Year Report. Chicago: Liturgy Training Publications, 1992. .
 From Age to Age: How Christians Celebrated the Eucharist. Chicago: Liturgy Training Publications, 1991. .
 時代から時代へ―礼拝、音楽、建築でたどるキリスト教の変遷. Tokyo: Sei ko kai Shuppan, 2004. .
 The First Ordinary of the Royal Abbey of St.-Denis in France (Paris, Bibliothèque Mazarine 526). Fribourg: The University Press, 1990. .
 Rites of Religious Profession. Chicago: Liturgy Training Publications, 1989. .
 Music and the Eucharistic Prayer. With Mary McGann. Washington, DC: The Pastoral Press, 1988. .
 Music in Ritual: A Pre-Theological Investigation. Washington, DC: The Pastoral Press, 1984. .

Honors and grants 
 2021. Frederick R. McManus Award, Federation of Diocesan Liturgical Commissions. 
 2018. Citizen Service Award, University of Chicago – Department of Safety and Security. 
 2017, 2009, 2008 (x 2), 2005, 1994. Catholic Press Association, publishing awards. 
 2016. Videographer Award for Encountering the Mystery: An Overview of Eucharistic Theology. 
 2013. Berakah Award, North American Academy of Liturgy. 
 2003. Jubilate Deo Award, National Association of Pastoral Musicians.  
 1997. Lawrence F. Heiman Award, St. Joseph's College.

References 

1948 births
Living people
Writers from Gary, Indiana
Catholic Theological Union faculty
Saint Joseph's College (Indiana) alumni
University of Wisconsin–Milwaukee alumni
University of Notre Dame alumni
St. Catherine University faculty
Seattle University faculty
University of St. Thomas (Minnesota) faculty
University of Chicago faculty
20th-century American Roman Catholic priests
21st-century American Roman Catholic priests
Capuchins